Events in the year 2020 in Slovenia.

Incumbents
President: Borut Pahor
Prime Minister: Marjan Šarec (until March 13) Janez Janša (from March 13)

Events

January 
January 27 – Incumbent Prime Minister Marjan Šarec resigns, citing inefficiency of his minority government, and calls for early elections.

March 

March 4 – The first case of the COVID-19 pandemic in the country is detected.
March 12 – The acting government formally declares an epidemic and activates the national emergency response plan in response to the spread of COVID-19.
March 13 – The newly formed coalition led by prime minister Janez Janša is confirmed by the National Assembly, and sworn in as the 14th Government of Slovenia.
March 16 – All educational institutions in the country are closed to limit the spread of COVID-19.
March 30 – All public gatherings are banned, and movement is restricted to the municipality of residence (with some exceptions).

April 
April 18 – The government begins to ease restrictions on movement due to the decreasing number of COVID-19 cases, with the most severe bans lifted on April 30.

May 
May 2 
 No new COVID-19 infections are detected for the first time since the outbreak of the epidemic on March 4.
 Thousands of demonstrators on bicycles stage a protest against the government in Ljubljana due to allegations of corruption and mismanagement of the COVID-19 epidemic response.
May 15 – Slovenia becomes the first European country to lift the declaration of the COVID-19 epidemic (effective May 31), but several restrictions remain in place.

September 
September 3 – After several delays, the first Slovene-built satellites, Nemo HD and Trisat, are carried successfully to space by Vega launch vehicle.

October 
 October 19 - The government declares a COVID-19 epidemic again in response to the rising number of confirmed cases since September, enacts a 9 pm-6 am curfew and limits public gatherings and businesses.
 October 27 - To limit the spread of COVID-19, movement of citizens is again restricted to municipality of residence, though with more extensive list of exceptions.

December 
 December 27 - Mass vaccination against COVID-19 starts with the Pfizer–BioNTech vaccine, at the same time as most other EU states.

Deaths
31 January – Janez Stanovnik, economist and politician (b. 1922)
18 March – Peter Musevski, actor (b. 1965)
11 April – Alojz Uran, Roman Catholic prelate (b. 1945)
17 May – Aleksandra Kornhauser Frazer, chemist (b. 1926)
18 May – Marko Elsner, footballer (b. 1960)
1 June – Janez Kocijančič, politician and lawyer (b. 1941)
8 November - Miro Steržaj,  9-pin bowling player, businessman and politician (b. 1933)
14 November - Peter Florjančič, inventor and athlete (b. 1919).
21 November - Jožef Smej, Roman Catholic prelate (b. 1922)

References

 
2020s in Slovenia
Years of the 21st century in Slovenia